The 1960 San Jose State Spartans football team represented San Jose State College during the 1960 NCAA University Division football season.

San Jose State played as an Independent in 1960. The team was led by fourth-year head coach Bob Titchenal, and played home games at Spartan Stadium in San Jose, California. The Spartans finished the 1960 season with a record of five wins and four losses (5–4). Overall, the team was outscored by its opponents 175–176 for the season.

Schedule

Team players in the NFL/AFL
The following San Jose State players were selected in the 1961 NFL Draft.

The following San Jose State players were selected in the 1961 AFL Draft.

Notes

References

San Jose State
San Jose State Spartans football seasons
San Jose State Spartans football